A swathe of the Cotswold Hills almost 60 miles long has been proposed as the Cotswold Hills Geopark. The Geopark project offers educational resources on everything from the dinosaurs that once roamed the area to explaining how geology has influenced the building of the region's traditional drystone walls.

See also
 International Network of Geoparks
 List of Geoparks

Geology of Gloucestershire
Geology of Oxfordshire
Cotswolds
Geoparks in England